María Izquierdo may refer to:

 María Izquierdo (actress) (born 1960), Chilean actress
 María Izquierdo (artist) (1902–1955), Mexican painter
 María Izquierdo Rojo (born 1946), Spanish politician